Romanesti may refer to:

Româneşti (disambiguation), several places in Romania
Romaneşti, a village in Roșiile Commune, Vâlcea County, Romania
Romăneşti, a commune in Străşeni district, Moldova